Information space is the set of concepts, and relations among them, held by an information system; it describes the range of possible values or meanings an entity can have under the given rules and circumstances.

Scholarly definitions

Another definition, which is a bit more idealistic, is that an Information Space is the total result of the semantic activity of the humanity, "the world of names and titles", conjugated to the ontological world. Being a primary concept, the information space cannot be precisely defined and is set as a dialectical opposition to the material, physical, object space.

Author Max H. Boisot, wrote a book on Information Space: A framework for learning in organizations, institutions and culture. In his book, Boisot (1995, p. 5)  describes information space as a conceptual framework or tool for studying how knowledge and information are codified, abstracted and diffused through a social system.

See also 
Cognitive space
Information ecosystem
Semantics

References 

Information